HMS Solent was a S-class submarine built by Cammell Laird and launched on 8 June 1944 of the third batch built for the Royal Navy during World War II. She spent most of her career in the Pacific Far East, often in company with her sister ship, . Together they sank fifteen Japanese sailing vessels and the Japanese auxiliary minesweeper Wa 3. She survived the war and was sold for scrap in 1961.

Design and description
The last 17 boats of the third batch were significantly modified from the earlier boats. They had a stronger hull, carried more fuel and their armament was revised. They displaced  on the surface and  submerged. The S-class submarines had a crew of 48 officers and ratings.

For surface running, the boats were powered by two  diesel engines, each driving one propeller shaft. When submerged each propeller was driven by a  electric motor. They could reach  on the surface and  underwater.

Solent was armed with six 21 inch (533 mm) torpedo tubes in the bow. She carried six reload torpedoes for a grand total of a dozen torpedoes. Twelve mines could be carried in lieu of the torpedoes. The boat was also equipped with a 4-inch (102 mm) deck gun.

Construction and career
HMS Solent was built by Cammell Laird and launched on 8 June 1944. She served during the Second World War, spending most of her career in the Pacific Far East, often in company with her sister ship, . Together they sank fifteen Japanese sailing vessels and the Japanese auxiliary minesweeper Wa 3.  Solent then went on to sink a Japanese patrol vessel and a Japanese landing craft, whilst damaging another. Solent survived the Second World War, and was sold off, arriving at Troon on 28 August 1961 for breaking up.

Notes

References
 
  
 
 
 

 

British S-class submarines (1931)
1944 ships
World War II submarines of the United Kingdom
Ships built on the River Mersey